The Trinidad and Tobago men's national field hockey team represents Trinidad and Tobago in men's international field hockey competitions.

Tournament record

Pan American Games
 1967 – 
 1971 – 7th place
 1979 – 9th place
 1983 – 7th place
 1987 – 5th place
 1991 – 7th place
 1995 – 5th place
 1999 – 6th place
 2003 – 6th place
 2007 – 4th place
 2011 – 7th place
 2015 – 7th place
 2019 – 5th place

Pan American Cup
 2004 – 4th place
 2009 – 5th place
 2013 – 
 2017 – 4th place
 2022 – 7th place

Commonwealth Games
 1998 – 8th place
 2006 – 10th place
 2010 – 10th place
 2014 – 10th place

Central American and Caribbean Games
 1982 – 4th place
 1986 – 
 1990 – 4th place
 1993 – 
 1998 – 
 2002 – 
 2006 – 
 2010 – 
 2014 – 
 2018 – 
 2023 – Qualified

Hockey World League
 2012–13 – 26th place
 2014–15 – 34th place
 2016–17 – 26th place

See also
Trinidad and Tobago women's national field hockey team

References

External links

Trinidad and Tobago Hockey Board - Official website
FIH profile

Americas men's national field hockey teams
Men's sport in Trinidad and Tobago
National team
Field hockey